Crest View Heights is a neighborhood and census-designated place (CDP) in the town of Owego, Tioga County, New York, United States. It was first listed as a CDP prior to the 2020 census.

The community is in southeastern Tioga County, on the eastern side of Owego. It is bordered to the east by the town of Union in Broome County and to the south by the Southern Tier Line of the Norfolk Southern Railway. The CDP lies on a large hillside that rises to the north above the valley of the Susquehanna River.

New York Route 17C passes through the CDP, close to the southern border.

Demographics

References 

Census-designated places in Tioga County, New York
Census-designated places in New York (state)